Bissau is a town and a municipality in Jhunjhunu district in the state of Rajasthan, India.

Demographics
 India census, Bissau had a population of 23,227. Males constitute 51% of the population and females 49%. Bissau has an average literacy rate of 60%, higher than the national average of 59.5%, with male literacy of 70% and female literacy of 50%. 18% of the population is under 6 years of age.

References

http://www.censusindia.gov.in/

Cities and towns in Jhunjhunu district